The 2011–12 Big Bash League season or BBL|01 was the inaugural season of the Big Bash League, the premier Twenty20 cricket competition in Australia. The tournament replaced the KFC Twenty20 Big Bash, which ran each season from 2005–06 to 2010–11.

The tournament was won by the Sydney Sixers, which defeated the Perth Scorchers in the final at the WACA Ground on 28 January 2012. David Hussey of the Melbourne Stars was named the player of the tournament, having scored 243 runs and taken eight wickets in eight matches.

Average attendance

Melbourne Stars 27,424

Adelaide Strikers 21,986

Sydney Sixers 20,068

Sydney Thunder 18,423

Brisbane Heat 17,072

Perth Scorchers 14,905

Melbourne Renegades 13,324

Hobart Hurricanes 10,517

Teams
The competition features eight city-based franchises, instead of the six state-based teams which had previously competed in the KFC Twenty20 Big Bash. Each state's capital city features one team, with Sydney and Melbourne featuring two.

Points table

Fixtures
The fixtures were announced in July 2011. The final was played on Saturday, 28 January 2012.

Round 1

Round 2

Round 3

Round 4

Round 5

Round 6

Round 7

Knockout phase

Draw

Semi-finals

Final

Statistics

Highest team totals
The following table lists the six highest team scores during this season.

Last Updated 29 January 2012.

Most runs
The top five highest run scorers (total runs) in the season are included in this table.

Last Updated 29 January 2012.

Highest scores
This table contains the top five highest scores of the season made by a batsman in a single innings.

Last Updated 29 January 2012.

Most wickets
The following table contains the five leading wicket-takers of the season.

Last Updated 29 January 2012.

Best bowling figures
This table lists the top five players with the best bowling figures in the season.

Last Updated 29 January 2012.

Highest attendances
The following table lists the matches with the highest attendance during this season.

Last Updated 20 January 2012.

References

Big Bash League seasons
Big Bash League
Big Bash League